Thomas Gray (born 24 January 1936) is a Canadian rower. He competed in the men's eight event at the 1964 Summer Olympics.

References

External links
 

1936 births
Living people
Canadian male rowers
Olympic rowers of Canada
Rowers at the 1964 Summer Olympics
Place of birth missing (living people)
Commonwealth Games medallists in rowing
Commonwealth Games bronze medallists for Canada
Rowers at the 1962 British Empire and Commonwealth Games
Pan American Games medalists in rowing
Pan American Games gold medalists for Canada
Rowers at the 1963 Pan American Games
20th-century Canadian people
21st-century Canadian people
Medallists at the 1962 British Empire and Commonwealth Games